Teletubbies – The Album is an album that was released based on the British children's television show Teletubbies owned by the BBC. The album's single "Teletubbies Say 'Eh-oh!'" was a number-one hit album in the UK Singles Chart in December 1997 and reached number 13 in the Dutch Singles Chart in late 1998.

Teletubbies - The Cast  contains the characters of:

Po (played by Pui Fan Lee)
Dipsy (played by John Simmit)
Tinky Winky (played by Simon Shelton)
Laa-Laa (played by Nikky Smedley)
The Sun Baby (played by Jess Smith) 
The Narrator (played by Tim Whitnall)

Track listing

National chart performances

Personnel

Teletubbies
 Dipsy (John Simmit) - Vocals (on Teletubbies say Eh-oh! and Dipsy's Fancy Hat), Piano, Keyboard, Synthesizer, Organ, Harpsichord, Mellotron, Rhodes piano
 Tinky Winky (Simon Shelton) - Vocals (all tracks except Dipsy's Fancy Hat), Guitars
 Po (Pui Fan Lee) - Vocals (on Teletubbies say Eh-oh!), Drums
 Laa-Laa (Nikky Smedley) - Vocals (on Teletubbies say Eh-oh!), Bass

Musicians

Teletubbies Say Eh-oh! 
 Jimmy Johnson, Albhy Galuten, Barry Beckett - guitars
 Donald "Duck" Dunn - bass
 Roger Hawkins - drums
 Bill Payne - piano

Baa Baa Black Sheep
 Jimmy Johnson, Albhy Galuten, Barry Beckett - guitars
 Donald "Duck" Dunn - bass
 Roger Hawkins - drums

Mary, Mary, Quite Contrary
 David Lindley - fiddle
 Kelly Emberg - vocals
 Bruce Miller - string arrangements
 Bill Payne - piano
 Pete Sears - Harpsichord

Dipsy's Fancy Hat
 Tim Whitnall  - narrator 
 Pete Sears - Piano
 Irene Chanter - background vocals
 Ray Cooper - percussion
 Jimmy Johnson, Steve Crooper, Fred Tackett, Barry Beckett - guitars

References

External links 
 Official Teletubbies Website

1998 albums
Children's music albums
Teletubbies
Kid Rhino albums